110 Sul is a Federal District Metro brazilian station on Orange and Green lines. It was opened on 16 September 2020 and added to the already operating section of the line, from Central to Terminal Samambaia and Terminal Ceilândia. It is located between 108 Sul and 112 Sul.

References

Brasília Metro stations
2020 establishments in Brazil
Railway stations opened in 2020